South Montreat Road Historic District is a national historic district located at Black Mountain, Buncombe County, North Carolina.  The district encompasses 34 contributing buildings in a predominantly residential section of Black Mountain.  The district includes a variety of early-20th century dwellings in the Colonial Revival, American Craftsman, and Neoclassical styles.  The district is characterized by a mix of primarily one- and two-story frame houses on small lots.

It was listed on the National Register of Historic Places in 2010.

Gallery

References

Historic districts on the National Register of Historic Places in North Carolina
Colonial Revival architecture in North Carolina
Neoclassical architecture in North Carolina
Buildings and structures in Buncombe County, North Carolina
National Register of Historic Places in Buncombe County, North Carolina